Wainumá (Wainambu, Wainambɨ) and Mariaté are an extinct, poorly attested, and unclassified Arawakan language. Kaufman (1994) placed them in his Wainumá branch, but this is not followed in Aikhenvald (1999).

Word lists
Word lists of Wainumá have been collected by:
Spix and Martius in 1820
Johann Natterer in 1832
Alfred Russel Wallace in 1851

A word list of Mariaté was recorded by Spix and Martius in 1820.

References

Indigenous languages of the South American Northern Foothills
Arawakan languages